Pico Airport  is an airport located  from Madalena on the Portuguese island of Pico in the archipelago of the Azores.

History
The first studies were completed to construct a runway for the remote island of Pico during the post-War era when, instead, a final decision in 1946 saw the construction of an aerodrome on the island of Faial. It was only on 5 May 1976, when the construction of a runway and terminal building began on the island of Pico, under the initiative of the Portuguese army, but completed under the administration of the Regional Government of the Azores.

This infrastructure was constructed in a morphological area that only permitted its construction oriented east to west, making it susceptible to dominant southerly winds, raising questions as to its original construction.

In 1990, with the arrival of new ATP aircraft for SATA Air Açores' fleet, the decision was taken to extend the runway, to improve operations with this type of aircraft.
 
In April 2005, Pico received its first direct flight from Lisbon. The airport had regular connections with Lisbon via TAP Portugal (til 2015) and Azores Airlines (from 2015 and as of today) and inter-island flights to other islands: in 2008, SATA Air Açores was responsible for movement of 58,000 passengers from the airport.

Geography
It is divided between the two civil parishes of Bandeiras and Santa Luzia on the northern coast of the island, located along the regional E.R.1-1ª roadway between Madalena and São Roque do Pico.

The runway is illuminated and can handle evening flight operations (although rare), using VFR or IFR flight rules, while approximation instruments are based on PI locators. The installation of an ILS system was adjudicated around 2010.

Airlines and destinations
The following airlines operate regular scheduled and charter flights at Pico Airport:

Statistics

See also
 Aviation in the Azores

References
Citations

Sources
 

Airports in the Azores
Madalena, Azores